Chrysocatharylla lucasi is a moth in the family Crambidae. It was described by Schouten in 1994. It is found in Kenya, South Africa and Tanzania.

References

Moths described in 1994
Moths of Africa